Arvati is a village in the Resen Municipality of North Macedonia. Located  from the municipal centre of Resen, the village has 137 residents. It is situated east of Lake Prespa, at the foot of Baba Mountain.

History
In the 19th century, Arvati was part of the Manastir Sanjak, a subdivision of the Manastir Vilayet of the Ottoman Empire. In 1873, the village was recorded as having 45 households and 136 male inhabitants (80 Macedonian and 56 Muslims). A few decades later, in 1905, Arvati's population consisted of 200 Macedonian Exarchate and 186 Albanians.

Demographics
According to some sources Arvati's population has historically consisted of Orthodox Macedonians and Sunni Muslim Albanians, with the latter forming a majority, much like the neighboring village of Krani. According to other sources historically the Christian population of the village was Bulgarian.

The mothers tongues of the residents, much like the ethnic affiliations, include 51 native Macedonian speakers, 84 Albanian speakers, and two with a different mother tongue.

Religion
The religious affiliations of the village's residents also followed ethnic lines, with 51 identifying as Orthodox Christians, 85 as Muslims, and one as something else, as of the 2002 census.

Arvati is home to four churches dedicated to St Nicholas, Sts Constantine and Elena, St Archangel Michael, and the Ascension of the Virgin Mary.

Gallery

References

External links
Local Arvati tourist site

Villages in Resen Municipality
Albanian communities in North Macedonia